The Peugeot 5008 is a series of automobiles produced by the French manufacturer Peugeot since 2009. Originally a mid-size MPV in classification, for model year 2017 it was reclassified as a mid-size crossover SUV. Five- and seven-seat versions have been available. Its engine range mimics the Peugeot 3008.

First generation (T87; 2009)

The first generation was unveiled in July 2009, and officially went on sale in November 2009. The 5008’s introduction coincided with the promotion of Peugeot design director Gilles Vidal, whose influence was already beginning to show itself in the firm’s models, promising a renaissance in styling direction.

The 5008 shares core structure and mechanical components with the first generation Peugeot 3008. The 5008 was awarded 2010 MPV of the Year by What Car? magazine. Owing to its spacious interior and futuristic design, the 5008 has been developed a loyal fan base who colloquially refer to the car as the 'Space Wagon'.

Facelift 
The first generation received a facelift in October 2013. The facelift has also brought a refreshed engine line-up that now includes the PureTech three-cylinder petrol, and the newer BlueHDi diesel options.

Engines

Safety

Second generation (P87; 2017)

The second generation is an SUV, unveiled to the press on 7 September 2016, before a presentation to the public scheduled for the 2016 Paris Motor Show. It is essentially a seven seater version of the Peugeot 3008, which was to be released in the spring of 2017. Its wheelbase is 165 mm longer, and about 50 kg heavier than the 3008. 

The 5008 is assembled in France at the PSA plant in Rennes. Assembly in China takes place at the Dongfeng PSA Plant in Chengdu, together with the 3008 II (called the 4008 in China) and the Citroën C5 Aircross. In China, these three models all share the same platform, engines and transmission.

Design
Unlike the previous generation that was a pure MPV, the 5008 is an SUV to follow the trend in sales. It is actually an extended version of the 3008, presented several months previously. Specific elements include a different front grille and front bumper, and a chrome arch running through the entire pavilion to the bottom of the rear window.

In the same way, the interior essentially takes up the iCockpit of its cousin. In particular, the 8-inch captive touchscreen, but also a 12.3-inch high resolution digital head up panel, is available.

On the other hand, the wheelbase extended to 2.84 m makes it possible to significantly increase the capacity; seven places are now available, divided into three rows. On the first, the passenger seat can be shelved to load the long objects. The second row is composed of three independent seats, retractable and adjustable in length and inclination. Finally, the third row consists of two additional seats which can be folded or removed individually.

Facelift 

A new facelift for the Peugeot 5008 was revealed in September 2020.

Hybrid
In February 2023, Peugeot launched the 5008 Hybrid, with the mild hybrid technology reducing fuel consumption by up to 15% compared to the petrol equivalent.

Sales

Notes

References

External links
Official website (United Kingdom)

5008
Compact MPVs
Crossover sport utility vehicles
Mid-size sport utility vehicles
Euro NCAP small off-road
2010s cars
2020s cars
Cars introduced in 2009